Lynher is an electoral division of Cornwall in the United Kingdom and returns one member to sit on Cornwall Council. The current Councillor is Sharon Daw, a Conservative.

Councillors

2013-2021

2021-present

Extent

2013-2021
Between 2013 and 2021, Lynher represented the villages of Linkinhorne, Golberdon, St Ive, Pensilva, Minions, and Rilla Mill, and the hamlets of Mornick, Trewoodloe, Maders, Trevigro, St Ive Cross, Parkfield, Caradon Town, Downgate, Plushabridge, Rillaton, Upton Cross, North Darley, Darleyford, Henwood, Sharptor and South Hill. The village of Bray Shop was also partly covered by the division (being shared with the Stokeclimsland division). The division covered 6894 hectares.

2021-present
Since 2021, Lynher has represented the villages of Linkinhorne, Golberdon, St Ive, Pensilva, Minions, Rilla Mill, Quethiock, Pillaton and St Mellion, and the hamlets of Mornick, Trewoodloe, Maders, Trevigro, St Ive Cross, Parkfield, Caradon Town, Downgate, Plushabridge, Rillaton, Upton Cross, North Darley, Darleyford, Henwood, Sharptor,  South Hill, Trehunist and Blunts. The village of Bray Shop is also partly covered by the division (being shared with the Altarnun and Stoke Climsland division).

Election results

2021 election

2017 election

2013 election

References

Electoral divisions of Cornwall Council